Mikhaila Rutherford is an American former paralympic swimmer. She won three gold medals and one silver at the 2004 Summer Paralympics.

Early life
Rutherford was born in a small Russian village around 30 kilometers from Chernobyl, which was the site of a nuclear disaster in 1986. As a result of the disaster, Rutherford was born premature and missing limbs. Due to her disability, her parents put her up for adoption where she was taken in by an American woman at the age of four. She began swimming at the age of eight and competed in swimming competitions in high school.

Career
While attending Alameda High School, Rutherford was invited to compete with Team USA's National Swim Team. She qualified for the 2002 IPC World Championships where she set a new world mark in the S10 Women's 100 backstroke. Rutherford later beat her old world record for the Women's 100 metre backstroke S10 at the 2004 Summer Paralympics, winning gold in the making. She finished the competition with three gold medals and one silver.

After graduating from high school in 2006, Rutherford accepted a placement at Rensselaer Polytechnic Institute with a major in biomedical engineering. In 2018, Rutherford was inducted into the Alameda High School Athletic Hall of Fame.

References

External links 
 Paralympic profile

Living people
Russian adoptees
Swimmers from California
Sportspeople from Alameda, California
Paralympic gold medalists for the United States
Paralympic silver medalists for the United States
Year of birth missing (living people)
Paralympic medalists in swimming
Medalists at the 2004 Summer Paralympics
Swimmers at the 2004 Summer Paralympics
Paralympic swimmers of the United States
American female medley swimmers
American female butterfly swimmers
American female backstroke swimmers
Medalists at the World Para Swimming Championships
21st-century American women